The 1919 Grand National was the 78th renewal of the Grand National horse race that took place at Aintree Racecourse near Liverpool, England, on 28 March 1919.

It was the first true Aintree Grand National since 1915, with the intermittent races being cancelled due to World War I and substituted by a "Racecourse Association Steeplechase" and later a "War National Steeplechase" at Gatwick Racecourse.

The 1919 National was won by the Poethlyn, ridden by Ernest Piggott. The pair had won an unofficial National at Gatwick in 1918 and on the back of this started 11/4 favourites, the shortest starting odds of any Grand National winner to date.

Finishing order

Non-finishers

References

 1919
Grand National
Grand National
20th century in Lancashire
March 1919 sports events